Kristin Just Folkl (born December 19, 1975) is an American former volleyball player and collegiate and professional women's basketball player.  She now goes by her married name of Kristin Folkl-Kaburakis. As a volleyball player she was part of the United States National Team.

Early years and Stanford University
She played basketball and volleyball at St. Joseph's Academy in her hometown of St. Louis, Missouri, leading both of her sports teams to state championships each year in which she played. Folkl was named a High School All-American by the WBCA. She participated in the WBCA  High School All-America Game in 1994, scoring twenty-three points.

In 1994, Folkl attended Stanford University and starred on their women's basketball and volleyball programs.

While at Stanford, she was a four-time volleyball All-American, a basketball all-American as a senior, and a two-sport academic all-American. She appeared in a total of six Final Fours (four in volleyball and two in basketball) and won three national championships in volleyball.  In her senior year, she was a first team All-American in both sports and was named the GTE Academic Player of the Year.  She was also a participant on the USA Women's National Volleyball Team, and was a first-alternate at the 1996 Summer Olympics.

In 1998, she won the Honda Sports Award as the nation's best female collegiate volleyball player.

Folkl graduated from Stanford in 1998 with a degree in economics. She has been inducted into Stanford University's Hall of Fame.

WNBA and overseas basketball career
She began her professional career with the Women's National Basketball Association (WNBA) playing for the Minnesota Lynx after the team drafted her during the 1999 WNBA Draft.  She was traded to the Portland Fire in 2000 to become a part of the expansion season Portland team.

She also played professional basketball overseas for teams in Australia, Switzerland, and Greece.

WNBA career statistics

Regular season

|-
| align="left" | 1999
| align="left" | Minnesota
| 32 || 1 || 16.2 || .479 || .143 || .538 || 3.6 || 0.7 || 0.4 || 0.4 || 0.7 || 4.9
|-
| align="left" | 2000
| align="left" | Minnesota
| 32 || 20 || 26.4 || .450 || .211 || .702 || 4.8 || 2.1 || 0.7 || 0.7 || 1.6 || 7.6
|-
| align="left" | 2001
| align="left" | Portland
| 32 || 31 || 26.9 || .428 || .417 || .825 || 7.7 || 1.4 || 0.6 || 1.1 || 1.2 || 5.6
|-
| align="left" | 2002
| align="left" | Portland
| 32 || 4 || 18.8 || .492 || .000 || .886 || 4.6 || 1.0 || 0.6 || 0.5 || 1.0 || 4.8
|-
| align="left" | Career
| align="left" | 4 years, 2 teams
| 128 || 56 || 22.1 || .459 || .229 || .726 || 5.2 || 1.3 || 0.6 || 0.7 || 1.1 || 5.7

Life after basketball
After her retirement from the WNBA, she returned to her hometown of St. Louis and served as a development officer for the Institute for Science and Health.

Since 2004, she has been serving as the director for development on the St. Louis Sports Commission, a privately funded non-profit organization.  Her duties include directing the revenue generation and fundraising efforts for the commission as well its affiliated St. Louis Sports Foundation.  She also coordinates the commission's partnership and membership programs.

Folkl is married to Tassos Kaburakis, an attorney and a professor in sport law and management at Saint Louis University.

According to an article in the St. Louis Post-Dispatch, she gave birth to her first child, Ian Nicholas, on August 29, 2006.

Vital statistics
Position: Forward
Height: 6 ft 2 in (1.88 m)
College: Stanford University
Team(s): Minnesota Lynx, Portland Fire (1999–2002)

Notes 

1975 births
Living people
All-American college women's basketball players
American expatriate basketball people in Australia
American expatriate basketball people in Greece
American expatriate basketball people in Switzerland
American women's basketball players
American women's volleyball players
Basketball players from St. Louis
Minnesota Lynx players
Parade High School All-Americans (girls' basketball)
Portland Fire players
Small forwards
Stanford Cardinal women's basketball players
Stanford Cardinal women's volleyball players
Competitors at the 1994 Goodwill Games
Goodwill Games medalists in volleyball